Dubrava is a village on the Pelješac peninsula in Croatia. It is connected by the D414 highway.

References

Populated places in Dubrovnik-Neretva County